Gomantong Forest Reserve is a protected forest reserve in Sandakan and Kinabatangan Districts of Sandakan Division, Sabah, Malaysia. It was designated as a Class 1 Protection Forest by the Sabah Forestry Department in 1984. The Gomantong Caves are within the reserve. Gomantong's terrain consists of low to moderate hills and flat areas with swamps. The forest is a mixture of dipterocarp and swamp forest.

Flora
Gomantong Forest Reserve hosts threatened tree species such as Hopea beccariana, Shorea atrinervosa, Shorea hypoleuca and Dipterocarpus confertus. Swamp species include Mitragyna speciosa and Nephrolepis biserrata. The reserve hosts numerous Diospyros, Tristaniopsis, Campnosperma, Syzygium and Cordia species.

Fauna
Gomantong Forest Reserve hosts migrating elephants. The reserve is home to orangutan, clouded leopard and wild boar.

References

Forest reserves of Sabah
Borneo lowland rain forests